The Cosmology Large Angular Scale Surveyor (CLASS) is an array of microwave telescopes at a high-altitude site in the Atacama Desert of Chile as part of the Parque Astronómico de Atacama. The CLASS experiment aims to improve our understanding of cosmic dawn when the first stars turned on, test the theory of cosmic inflation, and distinguish between inflationary models of the very early universe by making precise measurements of the polarization of the Cosmic Microwave Background (CMB) over 65% of the sky at multiple frequencies in the microwave region of the electromagnetic spectrum.

Science goals 

CLASS has two primary science goals. The first is to test the theory of inflation. In physical cosmology, cosmic inflation is the leading theory of the very early universe; however, observational evidence for inflation is still inconclusive. Inflationary models generically predict that a gravitational-wave background (GWB) would have been produced along with the density perturbations that seed large-scale structure. Such an inflationary GWB would leave an imprint on both the temperature and polarization of the CMB. In particular it would leave a distinctive and unique pattern of polarization, called a B-mode pattern, in the CMB polarization. A measurement of B-mode polarization in the CMB would be important confirmation of inflation and would provide a rare glimpse into physics at ultra-high energies.

A second primary science goal of CLASS is to improve our understanding of "cosmic dawn," when the first stars lit up the universe. Ultraviolet (UV) radiation from these stars stripped electrons from atoms in a process called "reionization." The freed electrons scatter CMB light, imparting a polarization that CLASS measures. In this way CLASS can improve our knowledge of when and how cosmic dawn occurred. A better understanding of cosmic dawn will also help other experiments measure the sum of the masses of the three known neutrino types using the gravitational lensing of the CMB.

Additional science goals for CLASS are to better understand our own Milky Way Galaxy and to search for evidence of exotic new physics through constraining circular polarization in the CMB and large-scale anomalies. (See the Low multipoles and other anomalies section of the cosmic microwave background article for more information on the latter.)

Instrument 

The CLASS instrument is designed to survey 65% of the sky at millimeter wavelengths, in the microwave portion of the electromagnetic spectrum, from a ground-based observatory with a resolution of about 1° — approximately twice the angular size of the sun and moon as viewed from Earth. The CLASS array will consist of two altazimuth mounts that will allow the telescopes to be pointed to observe different patches of sky. The four CLASS telescopes will observe at a range of frequencies to separate emission from our galaxy from that of the CMB. One telescope will observe at 40 GHz (7.5 mm wavelength); two telescopes will observe at 90 GHz (3.3 mm wavelength); and the fourth telescope will observe in two frequency bands centered at 150 GHz (2 mm wavelength) and 220 GHz (1.4 mm wavelength). Two separate telescopes, observing at different frequencies, are housed on each mount.

The CLASS instrument is specifically designed to measure polarization. As an electromagnetic wave, light consists of oscillating electric and magnetic fields. These fields can have both an amplitude, or intensity, and a preferred direction in which they oscillate, or polarization. The polarized signal that CLASS will attempt to measure is incredibly small. It is expected to be only a few parts-per-billion change in the polarization of the already-cold 2.725 K CMB. To measure such a small signal, CLASS will employ focal plane arrays with large numbers of feedhorn-coupled, transition-edge-sensor bolometers cooled to just 0.1 °C above absolute zero by cryogenic helium refrigerators. This low temperature reduces the intrinsic thermal noise of the detectors.

The other unique aspect of the CLASS telescopes is the use of a variable-delay polarization modulator (VPM) to allow a precise and stable measurement of polarization. The VPM modulates, or turns on and off, the polarized light going to the detector at a known frequency, approximately 10 Hz, while leaving unpolarized light unchanged. This allows for a clear separation of the tiny polarization of the CMB from the much larger unpolarized atmosphere by "locking in" to the 10 Hz signal. The VPM also modulates circular polarization out of phase with linear polarization, giving CLASS sensitivity to circular polarization. Because no circular polarization is expected in the CMB, the VPM allows for a valuable check for systematic errors in the data by looking at the circular polarization signal, which should be consistent with zero.

Because water vapor in the atmosphere emits at microwave frequencies, CLASS will observe from a very dry and high-altitude site in the Andes Mountains on the edge of the Atacama Desert of Chile. Nearby sites have been chosen by other observatories for the same reason, including CBI, ASTE, Nanten, APEX, ALMA, ACT, and POLARBEAR.

Current status and results 

CLASS is currently observing the sky in all four frequency bands. The CLASS 40 GHz telescope achieved first light on 8 May 2016 and began a roughly five-year survey in September 2016 after initial commissioning observations were complete. In early 2018, the first 90 GHz telescope was installed on the same mount as the 40 GHz telescope, achieving first light on 30 May 2018. In 2019, the dual-frequency 150/220 GHz telescope was deployed, along with a second telescope mount, and achieved first light on 21 September 2019.

CLASS has made a first detection of circular polarization from the atmosphere at a frequency of 40 GHz, which is in agreement with models of atmospheric circular polarization due to Zeeman splitting of molecular oxygen in the presence of the Earth's magnetic field. The atmospheric circular polarization is smoothly-varying over the sky, allowing it to be separated from celestial circular polarization. This has allowed CLASS to constrain celestial circular polarization at 40 GHz to be less than 1 μK at angular scales of 5 degrees and less than 4 μK at angular scales around 1 degree. This is an improvement upon previous limits on circular polarization in the CMB by more than a factor of 100.

See also 

 Llano de Chajnantor Observatory
 BICEP and Keck Array
 List of cosmic microwave background experiments

References 

Cosmic microwave background experiments
Radio telescopes